Metropolitan Baptist Church may refer to:

in the United States
(by state then city or town)
Metropolitan Baptist Church (Washington, D.C.)
Metropolitan Baptist Church (New York City), NRHP-listed